Quintus Tineius Sacerdos Clemens (c. 100 – aft. 170) was a Roman senator, who was Consul Ordinarius in 158 with Sextus Sulpicius Tertullus, and Pontifex.

An inscription at Side honored Clemens and his son Quintus Tineius Rufus as patroni.

He was the son of Quintus Tineius Rufus. Besides Rufus, Clemens' known sons include Quintus Tineius Sacerdos and Quintus Tineius Clemens.

Family tree

References

Imperial Roman consuls
2nd-century Romans
100 births
2nd-century deaths
Year of birth uncertain
Year of death unknown
Sacerdos Clemens, Quintus